Donaldson is an unincorporated community in West Township, Marshall County, Indiana.

History
Donaldson (also historically spelled Donelson) was laid out in 1871. A post office has been in operation there since 1871.

Geography

References

Unincorporated communities in Marshall County, Indiana
Unincorporated communities in Indiana